Großkrotzenburg is a municipality in the Main-Kinzig district, in Hesse, Germany. It has a population of around 7,500.

The town is mainly known for its swimming lake and its coal-fired power station.

Geography

Location
Großkrotzenburg is located in the extreme southwest of the Main-Kinzig district, in the southeast of Hesse, bordering on Bavaria. It lies on the right bank of the river Main.

Neighbouring communities
Großkrotzenburg borders on (from the north, clockwise) Hanau, Kahl am Main (in (Aschaffenburg district), and Hainburg (in Offenbach district).

Infrastructure

Utilities
Kraftwerk Staudinger is a coal-fired thermal power station located west of the town, directly on the Main river. Due to the size of its cooling towers, the power plant is a local landmark.

Transport
Großkrotzenburg lies on the Bundesstrasse 8.

References

Municipalities in Hesse
Main-Kinzig-Kreis